Olurotimi Akinosho (born November 30, 1988), known professionally as Rotimi, is an Nigerian-American actor and singer. He is known for his role as Darius Morrison on the Starz series Boss, and as Andre Coleman on Power.

Early life and education 
Rotimi was born in Maplewood, New Jersey and raised in a Nigerian household. He attended Columbia High School, where he was on both the varsity basketball team and the choir. He continued his studies at Northwestern University and graduated with a bachelor's degree in Communication with a minor in Business in 2010.

Career

Acting 
At his first trial with acting, Rotimi auditioned and subsequently got his first acting role on Boss as drug dealer Darius Morrison. Rotimi also appeared in three episodes of ABC's Betrayal.

Rotimi made his silver screen debut in the film Black Nativity (2013). Following this, he starred in Imperial Dreams at the 2014 Sundance Film Festival, which later won for "Best of NEXT".

Rotimi next appeared in the high grossing film, Divergent (2014). In 2016 Rotimi also acted in the movie Deuces alongside Lance Gross and Larenz Tate.

He was added to the cast of Starz' TV series Power as a series regular, in the role of Andre Coleman, the quick-tempered young protégé of the character Ghost. Rotimi was also cast in a recurring role on Battle Creek as Danny.

Music 
A contemporary R&B artist, Rotimi released two digital mixtapes, titled The Resume (March 8, 2011) and While You Wait (November 30, 2011). His videos have been featured on international and U.S. based entertainment media including MTV, MTV Base, and VH1 Soul.

Rotimi has performed on stage, opening for Jennifer Hudson, T.I., Estelle, and NERD; he also performed on BET's show 106 and Park and appeared in R&B singer Keyshia Cole's music video "Trust and Believe" as Cole's unfaithful boyfriend.

Rotimi garnered music placement with "I'm the One" on the first episode of Boss. In 2015, American rapper and executive producer of Power, 50 Cent signed Rotimi to his label, G-Unit Records. He also released his first G-Unit single "Lotto" featuring 50 Cent.

In 2016, Rotimi released "Doin it", a single from his 5-track project, Summer Bangerz. In 2017 he released his debut EP called Jeep Music Vol. 1.

In 2019 he released a single titled "Love Riddim" which has garnered attention from both old fans and newly made ones.

Fashion 
Rotimi is the lead model/spokesperson of rapper T.I.'s AKOO Clothing 2012 Spring/Summer campaign, April 2, 2012.

Personal life 
On November 25, 2019, Rotimi shared a picture of himself and Tanzanian singer Vanessa Mdee posing in an elevator, with Vanessa also confirming their relationship by posting the same picture with a different caption. Rotimi told the story of how the two met at a party and hit it off  and Vanessa also said in an interview how she knew he was her husband, only two days after meeting him. In a video posted on Instagram with Rotimi who was later joined by Vanessa, the pair revealed that they both had tattoos of each other's name on their bodies; her (middle) name, Hau, on his right wrist and his name, Rotimi, on her chest. They also have matching tattoos of the number 1045 on their wrists.

In December 2020, Rotimi got engaged to Vanessa.

Discography 

Studio albums
 All or Nothing (2021)

Filmography

Tours 
 Don't Matter Tour (with August Alsina) (2017)

References

External links 
 http://www.rotimimusic.com
 

Living people
21st-century American male actors
21st-century American singers
American male models
American people of Yoruba descent
American male singer-songwriters
American male television actors
Columbia High School (New Jersey) alumni
G-Unit Records artists
Northwestern University School of Communication alumni
People from Maplewood, New Jersey
Singer-songwriters from New Jersey
American people of Igbo descent
Yoruba male actors
Igbo male actors
Yoruba musicians
Igbo musicians
Yoruba male models
Igbo male models
Male actors from New Jersey
1988 births
21st-century American male singers
American contemporary R&B singers